For information on all Lamar University sports, see Lamar Cardinals and Lady Cardinals

The 1979–80 Lamar Cardinals basketball team represented Lamar University during the 1979–80 NCAA Division I men's basketball season. The Cardinals were led by fourth-year head coach Billy Tubbs and played their home games at McDonald Gym in Beaumont, Texas as members of the Southland Conference.  The Cardinals won the regular season conference championship to receive an invitation to the 1980 NCAA Division I men's basketball tournament where they defeated No. 7 seed Weber State in the first round and No. 2 seed Oregon State in the second round to reach the Sweet Sixteen for the first and only time in program history. Lamar fell to Clemson to finish the season with a record of 22–11 (8–2 Southland).

Roster 
Sources:

Schedule and results
Sources:

|-
!colspan=12 style=| Non-conference regular season

|-
!colspan=12 style=| Southland Conference regular season

|-
!colspan=12 style=| NCAA Division I men's basketball tournament

References

Lamar Cardinals basketball seasons
Lamar
Lamar
Lamar Cardinals basketball
Lamar Cardinals basketball